Trans Jogja is a bus rapid transit (BRT) system operates in Yogyakarta and surrounding areas, with 20 different routes. Trans Jogja operates from 06:00 to 19:00 starting from 22 March 2020.

Trans Jogja is currently operated by PT Jogja Tugu Trans, a consortium of Perum DAMRI and public transport cooperatives in Special Region of Yogyakarta (Koperasi Pemuda Sleman, Kopata, Aspada, Kobutri, and Puskopkar), and PT Anindya Mitra Internasional, a province-owned company. Their operations are under auspices of Office of Transportation of the Special Region of Yogyakarta.

In April 2020, the system had a daily ridership of 1,402, lower than normal amounts of 20,000-22,000 because of the COVID-19 pandemic.

Fares
Ticket fares on Trans Jogja are of flat rates. Passengers pay a flat fare and can go any distance along the bus route. Bus transfers are free at staffed stops.

Cards
As of 2022, Trans Jogja issues transit cards for use on Trans Jogja buses. There are two types of the cards:
 Regular Card: Can be purchased at POS stops costing Rp50,000 for each card with the same amount included in the balance. It can be topped up with Rp5,000 as the minimum top-up amount.
 Student Card: Can only be obtained through an educational institution.

Regular cards can be purchased at the point-of-sale (POS) stops:
Halte Adisutjipto Airport
Halte Terminal Jombor
Halte Ambarrukmo Plaza
Halte Taman Pintar

Routes

There are 20 bus routes operated by Trans Jogja as of 2022. Line 1A, 2A, and 12 are operated under Teman Bus service, while the rest are operated directly under the Trans Jogja branding.

Note: Line 1A stops and starts from Adisutjipto Airport heading to Prambanan.

Ridership

Fleets 
All of Trans Jogja fleets consist of medium buses. While most of the fleets feature high-level doors, the newer buses for Teman Bus have low-level doors for boarding albeit still having steps to climb onboard the high-level interior.

References

Transport in the Special Region of Yogyakarta
2008 establishments in Indonesia
Yogyakarta
Regionally-owned companies of Indonesia